Huish Episcopi is a village and civil parish in Somerset, England, situated on the outskirts of Langport,  south west of Somerton in the South Somerset district. The parish has a population of 2,644, and includes the hamlets of Bowdens, Combe, Pibsbury and Wearne.

History
Its name derives from the lands or household ("huish" from the Old English hiwisc) and episcopi meaning belonging to the Bishop of Wells. The bishops held the manor from Saxon times until 1859 when it was sold off to tenants.

Romano-British remains, including burials, coins and tesserae dating from the 3rd and 4th centuries have been found south of Wearne.

The parish of Huish Episcopi was part of the Kingsbury Hundred.

Governance
The parish council has responsibility for local issues, including setting an annual precept (local rate) to cover the council’s operating costs and producing annual accounts for public scrutiny. The parish council evaluates local planning applications and works with the local police, district council officers, and neighbourhood watch groups on matters of crime, security, and traffic. The parish council's role also includes initiating projects for the maintenance and repair of parish facilities, as well as consulting with the district council on the maintenance, repair, and improvement of highways, drainage, footpaths, public transport, and street cleaning. Conservation matters (including trees and listed buildings) and environmental issues are also the responsibility of the council.

The village falls within the Non-metropolitan district of South Somerset, which was formed on 1 April 1974 under the Local Government Act 1972, having previously been part of Langport Rural District. The district council is responsible for local planning and building control, local roads, council housing, environmental health, markets and fairs, refuse collection and recycling, cemeteries and crematoria, leisure services, parks, and tourism.

Somerset County Council is responsible for running the largest and most expensive local services such as education, social services, libraries, main roads, public transport, policing and  fire services, trading standards, waste disposal and strategic planning.

It is also part of the Somerton and Frome county constituency represented in the House of Commons of the Parliament of the United Kingdom. It elects one Member of Parliament (MP) by the first past the post system of election.

Geography
Much of the land is low lying with the rivers Yeo and Parrett meeting to the south west of the village. There were several stone quarries in the parish, particularly around Pibsbury.

Landmarks
One of the most popular landmarks in Huish Episcopi is the Rose and Crown pub, which was built around 1800. The pub is described at length in The Longest Crawl by Ian Marchant.

Economy
The largest employer in Huish Episcopi is the Southern Counties Fresh Foods Ltd new abattoir, which processes beef and sheep. An Abattoir Liaison Group was appointed, with members from the village, to help resolve community issues such as odours emanating from the plant, heavy goods vehicles on the narrow roads, and light pollution.

Education
The village is home to Huish Episcopi School, an academy school which has places for 1,200 pupils between 11 and 18.

Religious sites

Huish Episcopi is home to St Mary's Church, which also serves nearby Langport. Built in blue lias with golden hamstone decoration, the church is most noted for its classic  Somerset tower, deemed to be an architectural companion piece to St Martin's Church in Kingsbury Episcopi. St Mary's tower dates from around 1500 and was built in four stages. It is extensively embellished with pinnacles and quatrefoil panel bands. In the north-east corner is an octagonal stair turret which reaches the full height of the tower. A stained glass window by Edward Burne-Jones depicts the Nativity, other fine stained glass windows follow the life of Christ as told in the New Testament. It is a Grade I listed building.

The church appears on a Royal Mail stamp issued on 21 June 1972 as part of a set on British Architecture (Village Churches).

Railways
The nearby station of Langport East, on the Reading to Taunton Line, was closed in 1962, although the line itself remains open.

See also
Huish Episcopi School

References

External links
 Huish Episcopi Village, Somerset - Community website

Villages in South Somerset
Civil parishes in Somerset